The 2015 Troy Trojans football team represented Troy University in the 2015 NCAA Division I FBS football season. They were led by first-year head coach Neal Brown and played their home games at Veterans Memorial Stadium in Troy, Alabama. The Trojans were members of the Sun Belt Conference. They finished the season 4–8, 3–5 in Sun Belt play to finish in a five-way tie for fifth place.

Schedule
Troy announced their 2015 football schedule on February 27, 2015. The 2015 schedule consist of five home and seven away games in the regular season. The Trojans will host Sun Belt foes Georgia Southern, Idaho, Louisiana–Monroe, and South Alabama, and will travel to Appalachian State, Georgia State, Louisiana–Lafayette, and New Mexico State.

Game summaries

at NC State

Charleston Southern

at Wisconsin

South Alabama

at Mississippi State

Idaho

at New Mexico State

at Appalachian State

Louisiana–Monroe

Georgia Southern

at Georgia State

at Louisiana–Lafayette

References

Troy
Troy Trojans football seasons
Troy Trojans football